Trechus karlykensis is a species of ground beetle in the subfamily Trechinae. The species was described by Belousov & Kabak in 2001.

References

karlykensis
Beetles described in 2001